Abrıx is a village and municipality in the Qabala Rayon of Azerbaijan.  It has a population of 620.

References

External links
Satellite map at Maplandia.com

Populated places in Qabala District